Gouvy is a municipality of Wallonia located in the province of Luxembourg, Belgium.

On 1 January 2007 the municipality, which covers 165.11 km2, had 4,780 inhabitants, giving a population density of 29 inhabitants per km2.

The municipality consists of the following districts: Beho, Bovigny, Cherain, Limerlé, and Montleban. Villages in the municipality include Baclain, Bistain, Brisy, Cherapont, Cierreux, Courtil, Deiffelt, Halconreux, Halonru, Honvelez, Langlire, Lomré, Ourthe, Rettigny, Rogery, Steinbach, Sterpigny, Vaux and Wathermal. The administrative headquarters are situated in Bovigny.

The Ourthe Orientale river originates in the municipality of Gouvy, near the hamlet of Ourthe.

Transportation 
Gouvy railway station is served by intercity trains between Liège and Luxembourg. Gouvy used to be a railway junction, with connections towards Bastogne and Sankt-Vith. The line towards Sankt-Vith was dismantled in the 1960s. Passenger traffic to Bastogne was stopped in 1984, and the railway tracks have been converted to a RAVeL cycle/pedestrian path.

See also
 List of protected heritage sites in Gouvy

References

External links
 
Website of the municipality of Gouvy
Gouvy: 23 villages 

 
Belgium–Luxembourg border crossings
Municipalities of Luxembourg (Belgium)